Denza (born March 14, 1993) is the stage name of the Dutch music producer Dimitri van Bronswijk. His obsession for the Harder Styles convinced him to produce music himself in 2009.

In the beginning of 2013, Marcel Woods of 2-Dutch discovered Denza's tracks and signed him at his own record label Dutch Master Works. From there, Denza started to develop his own sound - Euphoric Hardstyle - which reached the ears of Q-dance, Scantraxx, and Be Yourself Music. After that, Denza released his music on Derailed Traxx, X-Bone, and Gearbox. Denza signed with Dirty Workz at the start of 2016.

Discography

Singles

Remixes

References

External links
 Official website
 Facebook
 Soundcloud
 YouTube

Living people
Dutch record producers
Dutch DJs
1993 births
People from Nunspeet
Hardstyle musicians
Electronic dance music DJs